The Maloelap Atoll (Marshallese:) (also spelled Maleolap) is a coral atoll of 71 islands in the Pacific Ocean, and forms a legislative district of the Ratak Chain of the Marshall Islands. In 2011 the population of the islands of the atoll was 682.

The largest of the islands that make up the atoll are Taroa (the administrative center of the atoll), in the northeast, and Kaben in the northwest. Only three of the other islands in the atoll are inhabited: Airuk, Wolot and Jang. The island is served by Air Marshall Islands via Maloelap Airport.

History
Maloelap Atoll was claimed by the Empire of Germany along with the rest of the Marshall Islands in 1884, and the Germans established a trading outpost. After World War I, the island came under the South Seas Mandate of the Empire of Japan.

In 1939, the Japanese built a seaplane base and landplane Taroa Airfield with two runways (4800' + 4100') and support buildings and facilities, including a radar station. During World War II the Japanese garrison of 2,940 navy men and 389 army men was commanded by Rear Admiral Shoichi Kamada. The perimeter of the island was heavily fortified with 12 heavy coastal artillery and 10 heavy anti-aircraft guns. The island was attacked by the United States Navy beginning in February 1942 starting with carrier-based aircraft and shelling by warships. The attacks grew in frequency and severity after Majuro and Kwajalein had fallen to the Americans. Of the 3097-man Japanese garrison (1772 Imperial Japanese Navy, 368 Imperial Japanese Army, and 957 civilians) only 1041 (34%) survived the war. Several Marshallese were also killed. A large number of war relics, including plane wrecks, mainly Mitsubishi A6M Zero fighters and Mitsubishi G4M Betty bombers remain scattered about.

Following the end of World War II, the island came under the control of the United States as part of the Trust Territory of the Pacific Islands until the independence of the Marshall Islands in 1986. Maloelap Atoll was the first to ratify the Marshall Islands' constitution.

Education
Marshall Islands Public School System operates public schools:
 Aerok Elementary School
 Jang Elementary School
 Kaben Elementary School
 Ollet Elementary School
 Tarawa Elementary School

Northern Islands High School on Wotje serves the community.

Notes

References
Marshall Islands site

Pacific Wrecks
 

 
Atolls of the Marshall Islands
Ratak Chain